Junior Puroku (born 26 January 1981) in the Cook Islands is a footballer who played as a midfielder for Tupapa Maraerenga in the Cook Islands Round Cup and the Cook Islands national football team.

References

1981 births
Living people
Cook Islands international footballers
Association football midfielders
Cook Island footballers
1998 OFC Nations Cup players
2000 OFC Nations Cup players